The Urokinase receptor, also known as urokinase plasminogen activator surface receptor (uPAR) or CD87 (Cluster of Differentiation 87), is a protein encoded in humans by the PLAUR gene.

Molecular characteristics 
uPAR consists of three tandem LU domains, which are protein domains of the three-finger protein family. The structure of uPAR has been solved by X-ray crystallography in complex with a peptide antagonist and with its native ligand, urokinase. All three three-finger domains are necessary for high affinity binding of the primary ligand, urokinase. In addition, uPAR also interacts with several other proteins, including vitronectin, the uPAR associated protein (uPARAP) and the integrin family of membrane proteins.

It has been possible to express uPAR recombinantly in CHO-cells and S2 cells from Drosophila melanogaster. 4 out of 5 of the possible glycosylation sites are used in vivo giving the protein a molecular weight of 50-60 kDA.

Physiological significance 
uPAR is a part of the plasminogen activation system, which in the healthy body is involved in tissue reorganization events such as mammary gland involution and wound healing. In order to be able to reorganize tissue, the old tissue must be able to be degraded. An important mechanism in this degradation is the proteolysis cascade initiated by the plasminogen activation system. uPAR binds urokinase and thus restricts plasminogen activation to the immediate vicinity of the cell membrane. When urokinase is bound to the receptor, there is cleavage between the GPI-anchor and the uPAR, releasing a soluble form of the protein known as suPAR.

Clinical significance 
Soluble urokinase plasminogen activator receptor (suPAR) has been found to be a biomarker of inflammation. Elevated suPAR is seen in chronic obstructive pulmonary disease, asthma, liver failure, heart failure, cardiovascular disease, and rheumatoid arthritis. Smokers have significantly higher suPAR compared to non-smokers.

Urokinase receptors have been found to be highly expressed on senescent cells, leading researchers to use chimeric antigen receptor T cells to eliminate senescent cells in mice.

The components of the plasminogen activation system have been found to be highly expressed in many malignant tumors, indicating that tumors are able to hijack the system, and use it in metastasis. Thus inhibitors of the various components of the plasminogen activation system have been sought as possible anticancer drugs.

uPAR has been involved in various other non-proteolytic processes related to cancer, such as cell migration, cell cycle regulation, and cell adhesion.

Interactions 

Urokinase receptor has been shown to interact with LRP1.

See also 
 Cancer
 Cluster of differentiation
 Metastasis
 Plasmin
 Urokinase
 suPAR

References

Further reading

External links 
 
 

Clusters of differentiation